Charles Morgan (21 July 1909 – May 1994) was a Welsh actor.

Selected filmography
 Train of Events (1949) – Second plain clothes man (segment "The Actor")
 Radio Cab Murder (1954) – J. L. MacLaren
 The One That Got Away (1957) – Manager at Hucknall (uncredited)
 Hell Is a City (1960) – Laurie Lovett
 Cash on Demand (1961) – Det. Sgt. Collins (uncredited)
 The Day the Earth Caught Fire (1961) – Foreign Editor (uncredited)
 The Pot Carriers (1962) – Chief Disciplinary Prison Officer
 The Boys (1962) – Samuel Wallace
 Doctor Who (1967–1978) – Songsten / Gold Usher
 Duffer (1971) – Man Fighting
 Au Pair Girls (1972) – Fred
 Armaguedon (1977)
 Quincy's Quest (1979) – Narrator
 The Return of the Soldier (1982) – Weeping Man

References

External links

1909 births
1994 deaths
Welsh male film actors
Welsh male television actors
People from Tredegar
20th-century Welsh male actors